The Sony Ericsson W995 is a candybar slider model music phone designed by Sony Ericsson as the new Walkman flagship phone, previously known as codename "Hikaru". The W995 was introduced February 2009 and released on 4 June 2009 and uses the 4th version of the 'Walkman Player'. It is also the first Walkman phone to feature a standard 3.5 mm headset jack rather than requiring a FastPort connection. It features an 8.1-megapixel camera which seems similar to the C905. Although its camera is comparable to other cameraphones, the video quality is only QVGA (320×240) at its maximum, unlike the majority of cameraphones at the time that had VGA and HD videos.

The W995 is available in three different colors which have been advertised as Progressive Black, Cosmic Silver and Energetic Red. It comes with an 8 GB memory card in its package.

On August 21, 2009, it won the EISA Best Music Phone Award.

Features
3.5mm audio jack
Battery life
Talking - 9 hours
Music - 20 hours
Video - 5 hours
Shake Control (Image Stabiliser)
8.1 Megapixel Camera with Autofocus, LED flash, x16 digital zoom, Geotagging, Face detection, Smile Shutter and the Best Picture Feature
QVGA@30FPS Video Recording
Accelerometer
Bluetooth 2.0 with A2DP
Stereo Speakers
TrackID
SensMe
Walkman Player 4.0
SMS, MMS, Email, IM (Instant messaging)
Display Size - 240 × 320 pixels (2.6 inches)
Internet Browser
WAP
3G/HSPA
GPS with a-GPS function
Wi-Fi - Although the phone is not VoIP enabled
SIP (Restricted to Specific Mobile Networks)
Quad band
FM Radio
Photo/Video Editing
BBC iPlayer and YouTube Compatible
Kickstand
16 GB Memory Stick Micro (M2) Support
DLNA Certified
Clear Stereo and Clear Bass

See also
Sony Ericsson Satio
Samsung i900 Omnia
Nokia N86 8MP

Notes

External links

W995
Mobile phones introduced in 2009